Lodomeria is the Latinized name of Volodymyr (Old Slavic: , ; , ; ; ; ; ;), a Ruthenian principality also referred to as the Principality of Volhynia, which was founded by the Rurik dynasty in 987 in the western parts of Kievan Rus'. It was centered on the region of Volhynia, straddling the borders of modern-day Poland, Ukraine and Belarus. The Principality of Volodymyr arose in the course of the 12th century along with the Principality of Halych.

"Vladimir" is the Russian form of the name of the city now called Volodymyr, which was the capital of the Principality.

Upon the first partition of Poland in 1772, the name "Kingdom of Galicia and Lodomeria" (probably in reference to the Kingdom of Galicia–Volhynia) was given by the Habsburg monarchy to the Polish territories which they acquired, while most of Volhynia (including the city of Vladimir) remained as part of rump Poland until eventually being annexed in 1795 by the Russian Empire in the Third Partition of Poland - though the Habsburgs did receive the small city of Belz.

Lodomeria - together with Galicia - provided one of the many titles of the Emperor of Austria, "the ruler of the Kingdom of Galicia and Lodomeria". However, Lodomeria existed only on paper, had no territory and could not be found on any map.

An item in American Notes and Queries published in 1889 identified Lodomeria as an ancient district of Poland situated in the eastern portion of the country.
About 988, the Ruthenian Grand Prince Vladimir the Great (born , Grand Prince of Kiev from 980 to 1015) founded the town of Volodymyr,
named after himself. In 1198, one of his descendants, Roman Mstislavich, called his own domain "the Kingdom of Galicia and Lodomeria".
In 1340, King Casimir of Poland annexed Lodomeria to Poland.

Origin of the title
The name "Volhynia" is first mentioned in Ruthenian chronicles as a region inhabited by a tribe called the Volhynians that was conquered by the Grand Prince of Kiev Vladimir the Great. Volhynia changed hands several times throughout the following centuries. About 1199, it was merged with the Principality of Halych to form the Principality (later Kingdom) of Galicia and Volhynia under Prince Roman the Great. After the death of Roman the Great in 1205, Andrew II of Hungary adopted the title of "King of Lodomeria" (as well as of Galicia), in reference to Volhynia. Although the Hungarians were driven out from Halych-Volhynia by 1221, Hungarian kings continued to add Galicia et Lodomeria to their official titles.

In 1527, the Habsburgs inherited those titles, together with the Hungarian crown. In 1772, Empress Maria Theresa, Archduchess of Austria and Queen of Hungary, decided to use those historical claims to justify her participation in the first partition of Poland. In fact, the territories acquired by Austria did not correspond exactly to those of former Halych-Volhynia. Volhynia, including the city of Volodymyr, was taken in 1795 by the Russian Empire, not Austria. On the other hand, much of Lesser Poland did become part of Austrian Galicia. Moreover, despite the fact that the claim derived from the historical Hungarian crown, Galicia and Lodomeria was not officially assigned to Hungary, and after the Ausgleich of 1867, it found itself in Cisleithania, or the Austrian-administered part of Austria-Hungary.

The full official name of the new Austrian province was "Kingdom of Galicia and Lodomeria with the Duchies of Auschwitz and Zator". After the incorporation of the Free City of Kraków in 1846, it was extended to "Kingdom of Galicia and Lodomeria, and the Grand Duchy of Kraków with the Duchies of Auschwitz and Zator". Therefore, from 1772 to 1918, "Lodomeria" was claimed by the Austrian monarchs, even though Volhynia, the region the name had originally referred to, was part of the Russian Empire.

References

Austrian Empire
History of Volhynia
Territorial disputes
Latin words and phrases